Lulsley is a village and civil parish  in  the Malvern Hills District of the county of Worcestershire, England, UK.

History

Lulsley was in the upper division of Doddingtree Hundred.

Following the Poor Law Amendment Act 1834 Lulsley Parish ceased to be responsible for maintaining the poor in its parish. This responsibility was transferred to Martley Poor Law Union.

Notable people
Jabez Allies, a solicitor and an important writer on Worcestershire history and folklore was born in Lulsley.

References

Villages in Worcestershire